The Michigan–Penn State football rivalry is an American college football game between the Wolverines of the University of Michigan and the Nittany Lions of Pennsylvania State University. Michigan leads the series 16–10.

Series History

Penn State joins The Big Ten
In December 1989, it was announced that Penn State would join the Big Ten Conference after previously competing as an Independent. Penn State started Big Ten Conference play in time for the 1993 season. The first contest was held in State College, Pennsylvania on October 16, 1993 where Michigan emerged as 21–13 winners. The two programs faced each other for a second time on October 15, 1994. Penn State secured their first win of the series with a 31–24 win in Ann Arbour, Michigan. Penn State finished the 1994 season undefeated whilst also winning both The Big Ten Conference and 1995 Rose Bowl.

Lloyd Carr era
Lloyd Carr was named as Michigan’s interim head coach on May 13, 1995, following the resignation of Gary Moeller following an off-the-field incident. Following a 9–2 start to the 1995 season, Carr was announced as the permanent head coach of the Wolverines on November 13, 1995. Five days after Carr was appointed as head coach of Michigan, the two sides faced each other on November 18, 1995. Penn State won the matchup 27–17. The programs met each other on November 16, 1996. Penn State extended their win streak against Michigan to three games after sealing a 29–17 victory. Carr secured his first win against Penn State in a 34–8 win on November 8, 1997. Michigan finished the season undefeated on route to winning The Big Ten Conference, 1998 Rose Bowl and were named national champions by the Associated Press. The two teams faced each other on  November 7, 1998. Michigan routed Penn State by a score of 27–0, resulting in the first shutout win of the series and Penn States first shutout loss since a 10–0 loss to Pittsburgh in 1987.

Penn State had started the 1999 season 9–0 and were ranked as high as second in the AP poll until a 24–23 loss to Minnesota in week ten. Prior to the game against Penn State, Michigan had started the season 5–0 before suffering consecutive losses to Michigan State and Illinois. However, the Wolverines had won two games on the bonce to take their season record to 7–2 before the meeting with Penn State on November 13, 1999. Despite losing by ten points with less than ten minutes remaining in the game, Michigan came back and won 31–27. The two programs faced each other on November 11, 2000. Penn State entered the game with a 4–6 season record, as a result, this was the first game in the series which featured an unranked team. Michigan won the game 33–11, extending their win streak in the series to four games. The 2001 edition of the game was played on October 6, 2001. For the second consecutive season, Penn State came into the game unranked, whilst Michigan was ranked at number fifteen in the AP poll. For the second time in the series, the game ended in a shutout win for Michigan as the Wolverines claimed a 20–0 victory. Michigan and Penn State met for the tenth time on October 12, 2002. With the scores tied at 21–21 after four quarters, Michigan running back Chris Perry scored a two yard rushing touchdown to secure the Wolverines a 27–24 overtime win.

After a two season hiatus in the series, the programs faced each other on October 15, 2005. Penn State came into the game undefeated with a 6–0 season record and were ranked at number eight in the AP poll. For the first time in the series history, Michigan headed into the game unranked after accumulating a 3–3 season record. Although Penn State entered the game as favourites, Michigan quarterback Chad Henne threw a touchdown pass to wide receiver Mario Manningham in the final moments of the game to claim a 27–25 win for the Wolverines. Despite the loss to Michigan, Penn State finished the season with an 11–1 season record whilst also winning a share of The Big Conference and claimed a win at the 2006 Orange Bowl. The two sides met each other on October 14, 2006. After starting the season 6–0, Michigan entered the game ranked at number four in the AP poll. Penn State entered the game unranked after compiling a 4–2 record to start the season. Michigan secured a 17–10 win after a strong defensive performance in which they recorded seven sacks. Michigan remained undefeated until a week eleven 42–39 loss to a number one ranked Ohio State. Michigan finished the season with an 11–2 record after suffering a 32–18 loss to USC in the 2007 Rose Bowl. Penn State ended the season with a 9–4 record which included a 20–10 win against number seventeen Tennessee at the 2007 Outback Bowl. Penn State entered the 2007 edition of the game ranked at number ten in the AP poll after starting the season with a 3–0 record. Michigan came into the game unranked after a 1–2 start to the season, which included a 34–32 loss to FCS school Appalachian State. The two sides faced each other on September 22, 2007. After a close opening three quarters, Michigan running back Mike Hart scored a one yard rushing touchdown to seal a 14–9 win for Michigan. This was Michigan’s ninth consecutive win in the series.

Head coaching change at Michigan
On November 19, 2007, it was announced publicly that Lloyd Carr would retire at the end of the 2007 season after spending thirteen seasons as head coach of Michigan. Carr's final game as head coach was a 41–35 win against number nine Florida in the 2008 Capital One Bowl. At the time of his retirement, Carr had compiled a 9–2 record against Penn State. On December 17, 2007, it was announced that West Virginia head coach Rich Rodriguez would replace Carr as head coach of Michigan. Rodriguezes first game against Penn State was on October 18, 2008. Michigan arrived at the game unranked after a difficult 2–4 start to the season. Penn State entered the game ranked at number three after an undefeated 7–0 start to the season. Penn State ended their nine game losing streak to Michigan with a 46–17 win in what was Penn States first victory over the Wolverines since 1996. Penn State ended the season with an 11–2 record which culminated in a 38–24 loss to number four ranked USC in the 2009 Rose Bowl. Michigan finished the season with a 3–9 record which represented the programs first losing season since 1967 and the most losses for a season in the history of the program.

Penn State had started the 2009 season with a 6–1 record ahead of their meeting with Michigan on October 24, 2009. Michigan had won their opening four games of the season which included a 38–34 win over number eighteen Notre Dame. Despite the positive start to the season, Michigan would lose consecutive games to Michigan State and Iowa before defeating Delaware State a week prior to the game against Penn State which took their record to 5–2. Penn State quarterback Daryll Clark threw three touchdown passes to wide receiver Graham Zug as the Nittany Lions secured a 35–10 victory. Penn State finished the 2009 season with an 11–2 record, which concluded with a 19–17 win over number twelve LSU at the 2010 Capital One Bowl. Following the loss to Penn State, Michigan would go on to lose the remaining four games of the season and finished with a season record of 5–7 in what was the programs second consecutive losing season. For the first time in the history of the series, both sides entered the meeting as unranked teams when they faced each other in a week eight matchup on October 30, 2010. Michigan entered the game with a 5–2 record after losing successive games to Michigan State and Iowa in weeks six and seven. Penn State came into the game with a 3–3 record, which included a 24–3 loss in week two to number one ranked Alabama. In the game itself, Penn State quarterback Matt McGloin threw for two hundred and fifty yards as the Nittany Lions clinched a 41–31 win. Penn State would go on to finish the season with a 7–5 record, which ended with a 37–24 defeat to Florida at the 2011 Outback Bowl. After the defeat to Penn State, Michigan ended the season with three defeats in their final five games. Despite this, the Wolverines finished the season with a 7–6 winning record. Michigan’s final game of the season was a 52–14 loss to Mississippi State in the 2011 Gator Bowl.

Another change of head coach at Michigan
On January 5, 2011, it was announced that Rich Rodriguez had been dismissed as head coach of Michigan after three seasons. The programs athletic director Dave Brandon stated that "I believe this is the best decision for the future of Michigan football. We have not achieved at the level that
I expect." During his tenure as head coach of Michigan, Rodriguez had a total record of 15–22, which included going 0–3 against Penn State. On January 11, 2011, it was announced that San Diego State head coach Brady Hoke would replace Rodriguez as head coach of Michigan. Hoke went 11–2 in his first season as head coach, which concluded with a 23–20 overtime win over Virginia Tech at the 2012 Sugar Bowl.

Joe Paterno dismissed as head coach of Penn State
It was announced on November 9, 2011, that Joe Paterno had been fired as head coach of Penn State after forty six seasons. Paterno's dismissal was centred around the Penn State child sex abuse scandal and the arrest of former Penn State assistant coach Jerry Sandusky. At the point of his firing, Paterno had a 6–10 record against Michigan. Defensive coordinator Tom Bradley became interim head coach for the remainder of the 2011 which ended with a 30–14 defeat at the 2012 TicketCity Bowl against number twenty ranked Houston. On January 7, 2012, Penn State announced that New England Patriots offensive coordinator Bill O'Brien would become the new permanent head coach of the Nittany Lions.

The series went on a two season hiatus due to the 2010–2014 Big Ten Conference realignment, which placed Michigan and Penn State in two separate divisions. The two programs faced each other for the first time since 2010 when they met on October 12, 2013. Penn State came into the meeting unranked after opening the season with a 3–2 record. Michigan entered the matchup ranked number eighteen after starting the season with a 5–0 record. With the scores level at 34–34 after four quarters, Penn State running back Bill Belton scored a two yard rushing touchdown to seal a 43–40 overtime win for the Nittany Lions. Penn State would finish the season with a 7–5 record. Following the loss to Penn State, Michigan would end the season with a 7–6 record after losing five of their last seven games, which included a 31–14 loss to Kansas State at the 2013 Buffalo Wild Wings Bowl.

Bill O'Brien leaves Penn State
On January 2, 2014, it was announced that Bill O'Brien would leave his role as head coach of Penn State to become head coach of the Houston Texans. On January 11, 2014, it was revealed that Vanderbilt head coach James Franklin would replace the outgoing O'Brien as head coach of Penn State. Michigan had started the 2014 season with a 2–4 record which included a heavy 31–0 defeat at number sixteen Notre Dame in week two. Penn State had started the season with a 5–1 record ahead of their meeting with Michigan on October 11, 2014. Michigan ended their four game losing streak to Penn State with a 18–13 win in which they kept their opponents scoreless in the second half of the game. Despite the win against Penn State, Michigan would go on to lose three of their remaining five games and finished the season with a 5–7 record. Franklin’s first season as head coach of Penn State ended with a 7–6 record. The season concluded with a 31–30 overtime win against Boston College at the 2014 Pinstripe Bowl.

Jim Harbaugh returns to Michigan 
On December 2, 2014, Brady Hoke was fired as head coach of Michigan after four seasons. During his time as head coach of Michigan, Hoke's total record was 31–20, which included a 1–1 record in games against Penn State. On December 30, 2014, it was announced that former Stanford and San Francisco 49ers head coach Jim Harbaugh would become the new head coach of the Wolverines. Harbaugh had previously played as a quarterback for Michigan from 1983 to 1986. The 2015 edition of the game was played on November 21, 2015. The Nittany Lions came into the game with a 7–3 record, which included a week seven loss to number one ranked Ohio State. Michigan entered the matchup ranked number fourteen after starting the season with an 8–2 record. Michigan quarterback Jake Rudock threw for two hundred and fifty six yards as the Wolverines sealed a 28–16 victory. Michigan would go on to finish the season with a 10–3 record, which concluded with a 41–7 victory over number nineteen Florida at the 2016 Citrus Bowl. Following the loss to Michigan, Penn State would lose their remaining two games of the season as they finished with a 7–6 record, with the final game of the season being a 24–17 loss to Georgia in the 2016 TaxSlayer Bowl.

The next meeting between the programs was on September 24, 2016. For the fifth consecutive season, Penn State came into the game unranked after opening the season with a 2–1 record. Michigan arrived to the game ranked at number four after beginning the season with a 3–0 record. In the game itself, Michigan were able to maintain their unbeaten start to the season after scoring six rushing touchdowns in a 49–10 win. Despite the early season loss to Michigan, Penn State went on to win the Big Ten Conference after defeating number six Wisconsin in the 2016 Big Ten Football Championship Game. The Nittany Lions would go on to finish the season with an 11–3 record after suffering a 52–49 defeat in the 2017 Rose Bowl against number nine ranked USC. Michigan remained undefeated until a week ten loss to Iowa. The Wolverines would go on to lose three of their final four games of the season, which included a 33–32 loss to number eleven Florida State in the 2016 Orange Bowl. Penn State entered the 2017 edition of the series ranked at number two after compiling a 6–0 start to the season. Michigan came into the meeting ranked at number nineteen after starting the season with a 5–1 record. The game itself took place on October 21, 2017. Penn State quarterback Trace McSorley scored three rushing touchdowns as the Nittany Lions secured a dominant 42–13 victory. Following the loss to Penn State, Michigan would go onto to lose three of their remaining six games as they finished with a 8–5 record. The Wolverines would conclude their season with a 26–19 defeat to South Carolina in the 2018 Outback Bowl. Penn States strong start to the season would continue as they finished with an 11–2 record, which included a 35–28 win over number eleven Washington in the 2017 Fiesta Bowl.

Michigan had started the 2018 season with a week one loss to Notre Dame. Despite this early defeat, the Wolverines would rise to number five after winning seven consecutive games to take their record to 7–1 ahead of their week nine meeting with Penn State. The Nittany Lions had initially started the season with a 4–0 record before suffering consecutive losses to Ohio State and Michigan State. However, Penn State had won two games on the bonce to take their record to 6–2 ahead of their meeting with Michigan on November 3, 2018. Michigan quarterback Shea Patterson scored three touchdowns as the Wolverines avenged the previous seasons heavy defeat with a 42–7 victory. Following the loss to Michigan, Penn State would win their last three conference games before suffering a 27–24 loss in the 2019 Citrus Bowl against number fourteen Kentucky. As a result, Penn State finished the season with a 9–4 record. Michigan would finish the season with a 10–3 record after losing two of their final four games, which included a heavy 41–15 defeat to number ten ranked Florida in the 2018 Peach Bowl. Penn State entered the 2019 edition of the game ranked at number seven after beginning the season with an undefeated 6–0 record. Michigan came into the game ranked at number sixteen after opening the season with a 5–1 record. Despite a second half resurgence from Michigan, Penn State held on for a 28–21 victory in which quarterback Sean Clifford scored four touchdowns. Penn States strong start to the season continued as they finished with 11–2 a record, with the final game of the season being a 53–39 win over number seventeen Memphis in the 2019 Cotton Bowl Classic. Michigan would finish the season with a 9–4 record which they concluded with a 35–16 loss in the 2020 Citrus Bowl against number thirteen Alabama.

Ahead of the 2020 season, it was announced that the programs in the Big Ten Conference would play an eight game, conference only schedule. The shortened schedule was carried out as a reaction to the COVID-19 pandemic. For just the third time in the history of the series, both sides entered the contest unranked. Penn State had begun the season with an 0–5 record, which represented the worst start to a season in the programs history. Michigan had started the season slowly and came into the game with a 2–3 record. The meeting itself took place on November 28, 2020. Penn State would claim their win of the season after scoring three rushing touchdowns in a 27–17 victory. Following the win over Michigan, Penn State would go on to win the final three game of their season to finish with a 4–5 record. After the loss to Penn State, Michigan’s remaining scheduled games against Maryland, Ohio State and Iowa were all cancelled due to concerns surrounding COVID–19 within Michigan’s program. As a result, the Wolverines would finish the season with a 2–4 record. The 2021 edition of the series was played on November 13, 2021. Penn State had initially started the season with a 5–0 record, however they would go on to lose three consecutive games before defeating Maryland a week prior to their meeting with Michigan to take their record to 6–3. Michigan entered the meeting ranked at number six after starting the season with an 8–1 record, with their only defeat coming in a week eight loss to Michigan State. Michigan quarterback Cade McNamara threw for three touchdowns as he guided the Wolverines to a close 21–17 victory. Following the loss to Michigan, Penn State would go on to lose two of their final three games as they finished the season with a 7–6 record which culminated in a 24–10 loss to number twenty one ranked Arkansas in the 2022 Outback Bowl. After the win over Penn State, Michigan would go on to win their remaining three conference games which concluded with a 42–3 win over number thirteen Iowa in the 2021 Big Ten Football Championship Game. Michigan finished the 2021 season ranked at number two in the College Football Playoff rankings. As a result, Michigan would enter the end of season 2021 College Football Playoffs. This was the first time that either Michigan or Penn State had taken part in the playoffs. Michigan would exit the playoffs after losing in the 2021 Orange Bowl to the eventual national champions Georgia.

Michigan entered the 2022 meeting ranked at number five after starting the season with a 5–0 record. Penn State arrived at the game ranked at number ten after also maintaining an unbeaten start to their season. The two sides faced each other on October 15, 2022. In the game itself, Michigan running backs Blake Corum and Donovan Edwards each scored two touchdowns as the Wolverines secured a dominant 41–17 victory. After the loss to Michigan, Penn State would go on to win six of their final seven games to finish the season with an 11–2 record which concluded with a 35–21 win over number eight Utah at 2023 Rose Bowl. Michigan’s strong start to the season would continue as they remained undefeated in conference play which included a 43–22 win over Purdue in the 2022 Big Ten Football Championship Game. Michigan ended the 2022 season ranked at number two in the College Football Playoff rankings. As a result, Michigan entered the playoffs for the second consecutive season. Michigan was eliminated from the playoffs following a 51–45 loss to TCU in the 2022 Fiesta Bowl.

Game results

See also
 List of NCAA college football rivalry games

References

College football rivalries in the United States
Michigan Wolverines football
Penn State Nittany Lions football
Big Ten Conference rivalries